The following is a list of Alabama State Hornets basketball head coaches. The Hornets have had 13 coaches in their 84-season history.

Alabama State's current head coach is Tony Madlock. He was hired in April 2022 to replace Mo Williams, who left to take the same position at Jackson State.

References

Alabama State

Alabama State Hornets basketball coaches